Bodega or craba is an Occitan term for a type of French bagpipe played in Montagne Noire, particularly within the French departments of Tarn, Aude, Hérault, and Haute-Garonne. It is also the name given to outdoor bars or cellars with festive music during ferias.

Construction
The bag is generally of goatskin (or sometimes sheepskin) in which are set wooden stocks to hold the pipes, generally of boxwood.  The pipes include:

blowpipe (bufet) through which air is blown into the bag
chanter (graile) on which the melody is played, using a double-reed
drone (bonda) which sounds a continuous harmonising note.  The drone rests on the shoulder of the player, and uses a single reed

External links
La Bodega at Lauragais-Patrimonie.fr

French musical instruments
Occitan music
Bagpipes